John MacNeil (1854 – August 1896), was a Presbyterian author and evangelist in Australia. He is best known for his 1894 book, The Spirit-Filled Life.

Life
MacNeil was born into a Presbyterian family in Scotland, but was brought up in Ballarat, Victoria. He studied theology at New College, Edinburgh and was ordained in 1879. Shortly afterwards he was introduced to the Higher Life movement.

He experienced "an anointing of the Holy Spirit" and in 1881 began evangelistic ministry. Poor health, however, hindered his itinerant work until he recovered after laying on of hands by an Anglican minister. He then toured Australia, seeing many people turn to Jesus.

In 1890, together with a few others, he formed a prayer group which came to be known as "The Band". They met regularly to pray for revival. They also focused strongly on the need for an infilling of the Holy Spirit, and prayed for "the full Baptism of the Holy Spirit for themselves and for all ministers, officers and members of the Churches."

From their prayer times came a decision to hold a Keswick-style convention in Geelong, with George Grubb, who had addressed Keswick Conventions in England, as the primary speaker, along with MacNeil, Webb and others.

In 1896 MacNeil toured Queensland a final time. At the end of his tour, in late August, he collapsed and died in a city shop.

Bibliography

Works
The Spirit-Filled Life, Chicago: Moody Press (1894)
Some One is Coming, London: Marshall Brothers (1896)
Honey Gathered and Stored, London: Marshal Brothers (1897)
Even So, Come, Chicago: Fleming H. Revell (1897)

Biography
John MacNeil, Late Evangelist in Australia, by Hannah MacNeil, London: Marshall Brothers (1897)

References
Barry Chant, The Spirit of Pentecost: origins and development of the Pentecostal Movement in Australia 1870-1939, unpublished Ph D thesis, Macquarie University, 1999.

External links
 
 
 Bio from Southern Cross College
 1896 article from The Brisbane Courier

1896 deaths
1854 births
Australian Presbyterian ministers
Evangelists
Australian people of Scottish descent
Australian religious writers
19th-century Scottish writers
Protestant writers
Scottish religious writers